Punch Kill starts south of East Cobleskill, New York and flows into the Cobleskill Creek in Howes Cave, New York.

References 

Rivers of New York (state)
Rivers of Schoharie County, New York